Ronald Habi (born 23 August 1977) is a Croatian retired football midfielder.

Club career
Habi was born in Kneževo, Popovac, SR Croatia, back then still within SFR Yugoslavia, in a family of Hungarian minority. He started his early career in Croatia and then in Serbia.

In 2002 he moved to Hungary where he spent the rest of his career playing with Debreceni VSC, Újpest FC, BFC Siófok, Báránd KSE, SNK Lug and Hajdúszoboszlói SE.

Habi received Hungarian nationality after moving to the country in 2002.

Honours
Debrecen
 Szuperkupa: 2006

References

External links
 HLSZ 

1977 births
Living people
People from Popovac
Croatian people of Hungarian descent
Association football midfielders
Croatian footballers
Hungarian footballers
OFK Kikinda players
FK Vojvodina players
Debreceni VSC players
Újpest FC players
BFC Siófok players
Hajdúszoboszlói SE players
First League of Serbia and Montenegro players
Nemzeti Bajnokság I players
Croatian expatriate footballers
Expatriate footballers in Serbia and Montenegro
Croatian expatriate sportspeople in Serbia and Montenegro
Expatriate footballers in Hungary
Croatian expatriate sportspeople in Hungary